Fedor Mikhailovich Dubiansky (1760 – 4 August 1796) was a Russian amateur musician and the author of the romance "A rock-dove moans" after the text of Ivan Ivanovich Dmitriev. He drowned while crossing the Neva in 1796, aged 36.

References

Russian composers
Russian male composers
1760 births
1796 deaths
Deaths by drowning